Charles Bruce Townshend, known as Bruce Townshend (21 November 1931 – 25 April 1987) was a New Zealand politician of the National Party.

Biography

Townshend was born in Paeroa in 1931, and he received his education at Netherton School and Paeroa College. Following this he took over his father's farm, before becoming the Rural Valuer and Director of the New Zealand Co-operative Dairy Company.

In 1971 he was elected to the Hauraki Plains County Council, and in 1974 he was elected to the role of Deputy Chairman.

During his time in Parliament, Townshed argued against Homosexual Law Reform, and advocated to Robert Muldoon to introduce a Goods and Services Tax.

Notes

References

1931 births
1987 deaths
New Zealand National Party MPs
People from Paeroa
Members of the New Zealand House of Representatives
New Zealand MPs for North Island electorates
20th-century New Zealand politicians